The 2000 NC State Wolfpack football team represented North Carolina State University during the 2000 NCAA Division I-A football season. The team's head coach was Chuck Amato.  NC State has been a member of the Atlantic Coast Conference (ACC) since the league's inception in 1953.  The Wolfpack played its home games in 2000 at Carter–Finley Stadium in Raleigh, North Carolina, which has been NC State football's home stadium since 1966.

Schedule

Roster

Game summaries

Maryland

Duke

Virginia

Wake Forest

MicronPC.com Bowl

Rankings

Awards and honors
Levar Fisher – ACC Defensive Player of the Year
Philip Rivers – ACC Rookie of the Year

Team players in the 2001 NFL Draft

References

NC State
NC State Wolfpack football seasons
Cheez-It Bowl champion seasons
NC State Wolfpack football